Trichocosmia is a genus of moths of the family Noctuidae. It contains only one species, Trichocosmia inornata, which is found from Texas to California, north to Utah.

References

Natural History Museum Lepidoptera genus database
Trichocosmia at funet

Hadeninae
Monotypic moth genera
Moths of North America